Flora Natumanya is Ugandan politician, legislator and women's representative for Kikuube District in the eleventh Parliament of Uganda. She is a member of National Resistance Movement (NRM).

Political career 
Natumanya defeated Tophas Kahwa in the NRM primaries to become the NRM flag bearer in the 2021 National election, the election she won to become the women's representative for Kikuube District in the eleventh Parliament of Uganda. She sits on the parliamentary Committee on Environment and Natural Resources in the eleventh Parliament of Uganda. Natumanya inquired about what the Ugandan government would do to reduce the rate at which sand deposits were being exploited in the Committee on Environment and Natural Resources sessions.

Other works 
Natumanya donated five salon vehicles to the people to act as medical service vans in Kikuube District. She also told the people of Kikuube District that the vehicles will be fuelled by her and also that she will be the one to pay the drivers of those vehicles.

References 

Living people
Members of the Parliament of Uganda
Women members of the Parliament of Uganda
21st-century Ugandan women politicians
21st-century Ugandan politicians
National Resistance Movement politicians
Year of birth missing (living people)